HMAS Broome (ACPB 90), named for the city of Broome, Western Australia, is an Armidale-class patrol boat of the Royal Australian Navy (RAN).

Design and construction

The semi-displacement vee hull is fabricated from aluminium alloy, and each vessel is built to a combination of Det Norske Veritas standards for high-speed light craft and RAN requirements.

The main armament of the Armidale class is a Rafael Typhoon stabilised  gun mount fitted with an M242 Bushmaster autocannon. Two  machine guns are also carried. Boarding operations are performed by two , waterjet propelled rigid-hulled inflatable boats (RHIBs). Each RHIB is stored in a dedicated cradle and davit, and is capable of operating independently from the patrol boat as it carries its own communications, navigation, and safety equipment.

Each patrol boat has a standard ship's company of 21 personnel, with a maximum of 29. The Armidales do not have a permanently assigned ship's company; instead, they are assigned to divisions at a ratio of two vessels to three companies, which rotate through the vessels and allow the Armidales to spend more time at sea, without compromising sailors' rest time or training requirements. A 20-berth auxiliary accommodation compartment was included in the design for the transportation of soldiers, illegal fishermen, or unauthorized arrivals; in the latter two cases, the compartment could be secured from the outside. However, a malfunction in the sewerage treatment facilities aboard  in August 2006 pumped hydrogen sulfide and carbon monoxide into the compartment, non-fatally poisoning four sailors working inside, after which use of the compartment for accommodation was banned across the class.

Broome was constructed by Austal in Henderson, Western Australia. She was commissioned into the RAN in 2007.

Operational history
Broome is assigned to Assail Division, is based in Darwin and performs border protection and fisheries protection patrols.

During 2008, Broome was one of two ships conflated to represent the fictional patrol boat HMAS Hammersley in the second season of Australian drama series Sea Patrol. 42 of the 86 days of filming occurred aboard Broome, with sister ship HMAS Launceston later used for pick-up filming.

In May 2010, she sailed to Kupang, Indonesia, to take part in a bilateral naval exercise. In July 2010, boarding procedures were demonstrated to Prime Minister Julia Gillard onboard Broome.

In October 2013, Broome participated in the International Fleet Review 2013 in Sydney.

Citations

References
Books

 The chapter is available separately as Semaphore, Issue 4, 2006 in PDF and HTML formats.

Journal and news articles

External links

Royal Australian Navy webpage for HMAS Broome

Armidale-class patrol boats
Naval ships of Australia
Ships built by Austal
2007 ships